Father Vojtěch is a 1929 silent Czech romance film directed by Martin Frič. It was Frič's debut film as a director.

Cast
 Josef Rovenský as Dvorecký
 Karel Lamač as Vojtěch 
 Ladislav H. Struna as Karel
 Suzanne Marwille as Frantina
 Karel Schleichert as Stárek
 Eman Fiala as Josífek
 Anna Opplová as Josífek's Mother
 Jindřich Plachta as Musician
 Jaroslav Marvan as Josef Knotek
 Eduard Šlégl as Priest
 Karel Němec as Innkeeper
 Jan Richter as Maránek
 Fred Bulín as Young Nobleman
 Josef Kobík as Policeman
 Karel Fiala as Abbot

References

External links
 

1929 films
1929 directorial debut films
1929 romance films
Czechoslovak black-and-white films
Czech silent films
Films directed by Martin Frič
1920s Czech-language films